Su Sara (also Romanized as Sū Sarā; also known as Sū Sarāb) is a village in Khormarud-e Jonubi Rural District, Cheshmeh Saran District, Azadshahr County, Golestan Province, Iran. At the 2006 census, its population was 929, in 226 families.

References 

Populated places in Azadshahr County